Kim Chung-tae (born July 6, 1980) is an archer from South Korea.

Kim was a member of Korea's gold medal men's archery team at the 2000 Summer Olympics. In the men's individual competition he finished fifth.

See also
Korean archery
Archery
List of South Korean archers

External links
Player profile

1980 births
Living people
South Korean male archers
Olympic archers of South Korea
Archers at the 2000 Summer Olympics
Olympic gold medalists for South Korea
Olympic medalists in archery
Medalists at the 2000 Summer Olympics
20th-century South Korean people
21st-century South Korean people